Æthelflæd  is an Anglo-Saxon female name meaning "noble beauty". Notable people with the name include:

 Æthelflæd, Lady of the Mercians, daughter of Alfred the Great
 Æthelflæd of Damerham, queen of England, second wife of King Edmund and mother of Edward II
 Æthelflæd Eneda, first wife of King Edgar and mother of Edward the Martyr
 Abbess Ælflæda of Romsey (Ethelflaeda), saint and daughter of Edward the Elder
 Abbess Æthelflæda of Romsey, 11th century abbess

Old English given names